Selig's Dry Goods Company Building, also known as Morrisons/Em-roe Sporting Goods Company, is a historic commercial building located at Indianapolis, Indiana.  It was built in 1924, and is a seven-story, rectangular, Beaux-Arts style building with a white terra cotta and aluminum front facade.  It was remodeled in 1933.  The building features tinted plate glass windows and a terra cotta Roman thermal window-like screen at the top floor. The building housed the Selig's Dry Goods Company, in operation until 1933.

It was listed on the National Register of Historic Places in 1984.  It is located in the Washington Street-Monument Circle Historic District.

References

Individually listed contributing properties to historic districts on the National Register in Indiana
Commercial buildings on the National Register of Historic Places in Indiana
Beaux-Arts architecture in Indiana
Commercial buildings completed in 1924
Commercial buildings in Indianapolis
National Register of Historic Places in Indianapolis